The 2005–06 Euroleague was the 6th season of the professional basketball competition for elite clubs throughout Europe, organised by Euroleague Basketball Company, and it was the 49th season of the premier competition for European men's clubs overall.

The 2005–06 season featured 24 competing teams from 13 countries. The Final Four was held at the Sazka Arena in Prague, Czech Republic on April 30, 2006. CSKA Moscow defeat the defending champions, Maccabi Elite by a score of 73–69 in the Final.

Regular season 
The first phase was a regular season, in which the competing teams were drawn into three groups, each containing eight teams. Each team played every other team in its group at home and away, resulting in 14 games for each team in the first stage. The top 5 teams in each group and the best sixth-placed team advanced to the next round. The complete list of tiebreakers was provided in the lead-in to the Regular Season results.

If one or more clubs were level on won-lost record, tiebreakers were applied in the following order:
 Head-to-head record in matches between the tied clubs
 Overall point difference in games between the tied clubs
 Overall point difference in all group matches (first tiebreaker if tied clubs were not in the same group)
 Points scored in all group matches
 Sum of quotients of points scored and points allowed in each group match
3-5 are used to break ties between 6th place teams

Group C

Top 16 
The surviving teams were divided into four groups of four teams each, and again a round robin system was adopted, resulting in 6 games each, with the two top teams advancing to the quarterfinals. Tiebreakers were identical to those used in the Regular Season.

The draw was held in accordance with Euroleague rules.

The teams were placed into four pools, as follows:

Level 1: The three group winners, plus the top-ranked second-place team
 Unicaja Málaga, Tau Cerámica, Maccabi Elite, Panathinaikos
Level 2: The remaining second-place teams, plus the top two third-place teams
 Climamio Bologna, Efes Pilsen, CSKA Moscow, Žalgiris
Level 3: The remaining third-place team, plus the three fourth-place teams
 Lietuvos Rytas, Benetton Treviso, FC Barcelona, Real Madrid
Level 4: The fifth-place teams, plus the top ranked sixth-place team
 Olympiacos, Brose Bamberg, Ülker, Cibona

Each Top 16 group included one team from each pool. The draw was conducted under the following restrictions:
 No more than two teams from the same Regular Season group could be placed in the same Top 16 group.
 No more than two teams from the same country could be placed in the same Top 16 group.
 If there was a conflict between these two restrictions, (1) would receive priority.

Another draw was held to determine the order of fixtures. In the case of two teams from the same city in the Top 16 (Panathinaikos and Olympiacos, Efes Pilsen and Ülker) they were scheduled so that every week, only one team would be at home.

Quarterfinals 
Each quarterfinal was a best-of-three series between a first-place team in the Top 16 and a second-place team from a different group, with the first-place team receiving home advantage.

|}

Final four

Semifinals 
April 28, Sazka Arena, Prague

|}

3rd place game 
April 30, Sazka Arena, Prague

|}

Final 
April 30, Sazka Arena, Prague

|}

Final standings

Final Four 2006 MVP 
 Theodoros Papaloukas (CSKA Moscow)

Individual statistics

Rating

Points

Rebounds

Assists

Other Stats

Game highs

Awards

Euroleague MVP 
  Anthony Parker (  Maccabi Elite )

Final Four MVP 
  Theodoros Papaloukas (  CSKA Moscow )

Finals Top Scorer 
  Will Solomon (  Maccabi Tel Aviv )

All-Euroleague Team 2005–06

Best Defender 
  Dimitris Diamantidis (  Panathinaikos )

Rising Star 
  Andrea Bargnani (  Benetton Treviso )

Alphonso Ford Top Scorer 
  Drew Nicholas (  Benetton Treviso )

Alexander Gomelsky Coach of the Year 
  Ettore Messina (  CSKA Moscow )

Club Executive of the Year 
  Sergey Kushchenko (  CSKA Moscow )

Regular season

Top 16

Playoffs

MVP of the Month

References and notes 

Euroleague Competition Format

External links 
 Euroleague.net - Official Euroleague homepage.
 Eurobasket.com - Popular basketball news site.
 TalkBasket.net - Basketball forum.

 
EuroLeague seasons